Accredited Symbian Developer (ASD) was a (now defunct) accreditation program for software developers using Symbian OS, a mobile phone operating system, having been terminated in April 2011 after the closure of the Symbian Foundation. The scheme was operated independently on the Foundation's behalf by Majinate Limited, which also closed for business when the Foundation closed.

Qualifications required

The primary qualification for being accredited as an ASD was a pass in an on-line multiple choice examination that adhered to the Principles of Symbian OS curriculum. This curriculum was reviewed on an annual basis to ensure that the accreditation kept up to date with developments in the Symbian operating system. The final release of the curriculum was made in 2009 although it still adhered closely to the ASD Primer, a learning aid published by Wiley under the Symbian Press imprint.

Curriculum

The final version of the curriculum contained the following major topics:

 C++ Language Fundamentals
 Classes And Objects
 Class Design And Inheritance
 Symbian OS Types & Declarations
 Cleanup Stack
 Object Construction
 Descriptors
 Dynamic Arrays
 Active Objects
 System Structure
 Client Server
 File Server, Store & Streams
 Sockets
 Tool Chain
 Platform Security
 Binary Compatibility

Each topic was assessed and marked separately in the examination and a pass required both a high score and coverage of the majority of topics.

See also
Software development
Software engineering
Software development process
Computer and video game development

External links
 Symbian developer website
 The Symbian Foundation website

Information technology qualifications
Symbian OS